The We Remember Foundation is a non-profit organisation established in 2004 with the mission of bringing officials of the Government of Belarus to justice for the disappearances and murders of political opposition leaders and journalists. It has since expanded to educate the public about human rights crimes and abuses in Belarus.

References

External links
 We Remember Foundation — in English and Russian

Organizations established in 2004
Human rights organizations based in Belarus
Political advocacy groups in Belarus